The Minister of Health, formerly styled Minister of Public Health, is a minister in the government of New Zealand with responsibility for the New Zealand Ministry of Health and Te Whatu Ora—Health New Zealand.

The current Minister of Health is Labour Party MP Ayesha Verrall.

History
The first Minister of Public Health was appointed in 1900, during the premiership of Richard Seddon. The word "Public" was dropped from the title when Sir Māui Pōmare took over the portfolio from 27 June 1923, as simply "Minister of Health".

In the health system reforms of the 1980s, the Department of Health lost responsibility for both the provision and funding of healthcare – these roles were transferred to separate Crown Health Enterprises (the precursors to today's District Health Boards) and the Health Funding Authority, respectively. The only function remaining was policy-making (resulting in the department being renamed a Ministry). For a time, there was a separate Minister in Charge of Crown Health Enterprises, who was not necessarily the same as the Minister of Health. Further reforms have changed this, however – the Health Funding Authority has been re-absorbed into the Ministry of Health, and the modern District Health Boards, while not part of the Ministry, are considered a responsibility of the Minister of Health.

In July 2022, on the passing of the Pae Ora (Healthy Futures) Act 2022, District Health Boards were disestablished and the provision and funding of healthcare was centralised under Health New Zealand.

List of Health Ministers
Key

References

External links
New Zealand Ministry of Health

1900 establishments in New Zealand
Health
Health
Health
New Zealand